Ana Soklič (born 10 April 1984) is a Slovenian singer. She represented Slovenia at the Eurovision Song Contest 2021 with the song "Amen", placing 13th in the first semi-final with 44 points.

Career
In 2012, Soklič participated in the first season of Slovenian version of X Factor, where she finished in 5th place.

On 20 December 2019, Soklič was announced as one of the twelve participants in EMA 2020, the national contest in Slovenia to select the country's Eurovision Song Contest 2020 entry, with the song "Voda". On 22 February 2020, she won the contest and was supposed to represent Slovenia at the Eurovision Song Contest 2020 in Rotterdam, Netherlands. However, the contest was cancelled on 18 March 2020 due to the COVID-19 pandemic. On 16 May 2020 it was announced that Soklič would represent Slovenia at the Eurovision Song Contest 2021. Her song "Amen" was presented on 27 February 2021. She participated in the first semi-final on 18 May, but failed to qualify for the final. It was later revealed that she had placed 13th in the semi-final, with 44 points.

Discography

Singles
 "If You" (2004)
 "Cosmo" (2004)
 "Oče (Father)" (2007)
 "Naj Muzika Igra" (2013)
 "Temni Svet" (2019)
 "Voda" (2020)
 "Amen" (2021)

References

1984 births
Living people
People from the Municipality of Bohinj
Eurovision Song Contest entrants of 2020
Eurovision Song Contest entrants for Slovenia
21st-century Slovenian women singers
Slovenian songwriters
Eurovision Song Contest entrants of 2021